The Last Days of the Late, Great State of California is a novel by Curt Gentry, published in 1968 by G.P. Putnam's Sons. The novel incorporates an extensive essay on the history and culture of California from the vantage point of a future date when the state has disappeared.

Plot synopsis
The novel describes, in retrospect, the history and culture of California from its earliest days, and its influence on the rest of the United States and the world when - after an unspecified date in 1969 - the state suffers a Richter magnitude 9 earthquake and the populous coastal regions west of the San Andreas Fault sink into the Pacific Ocean. This is in accordance with a fictional prediction by the real life psychic Edgar Cayce.

The catastrophic quake itself is covered immediately prior to the last chapter of the novel.  The quake is described as starting north of Point Arena, California and continuing southward as a large rupture on the San Andreas Fault, until it stops near Taft, California.  Pausing for moments, a second larger quake resumes, continuing southward through the Los Angeles, California area, and into the Salton Sea, where the rupture inexplicably turns towards San Diego, California and back into the Pacific Ocean where the quake ends.  As the quake progresses, various events (both large and small scale) are described in detail.  After this event, the narrative switches to "present tense" news radio and television coverage of the event using a literary convention of "changing the dial / channel" from one news report to another, to cover the disaster:  The Central Valley is inundated by the sea, the Embarcadero Freeway and Coit Tower have collapsed, along with the Oakland Bay Bridge.  The Golden Gate Bridge remains standing initially.  Los Angeles is in ruins.  As this narrative closes, two more disasters occur nearly simultaneously:  The Oroville Dam bursts, and in the twilight of the day, a passenger jet over San Bernardino is pulled out of the sky by turbulence, as the pilot tries to describe the sight of the San Andreas Fault splitting open in the dusk (and as is made clear in the final chapter, the pilot was witnessing Southern California slide into the sea).

The novel's epilogue lists what the world must now do without, due to this event, especially the large percentage of agricultural products that come from California. The bulk of the novel consists of the description of three regions: The north, The Central Valley, and the south. An account of the 1966 California governor's electoral campaign is central to the narrative.

Also discussed in detail are the 1965 Watts riots, in detail gleaned from then-recent news reports.

Reception
As a result of its publication, some religious believers in the Los Angeles region decided to move away, in fear of its fictional events actually occurring. The turmoil surrounding the book's publication became known as the "Great California Earthquake Scare".

References
Life (magazine), Nov 15, 1968, book review by David Snell, p. 32d
California Earthquakes: Science, Risk, &  the Politics of hazard Mitigation, Carl-Henry Geschwind. Johns Hopkins University Press, 2008, p. 161

1968 American novels
Novels set in California
History of California
Books about California
American alternate history novels
Novels about natural disasters